Yael Sharvit is an American linguist who is Professor of Linguistics at UCLA. She specializes in semantics and the syntax-semantics interface.

Education
Sharvit received her PhD in linguistics from Rutgers University in 1997; she was the third person to graduate from the program. Her dissertation title was "The Syntax and Semantics of Functional Relative Clauses."

Career and research
Sharvit is known for her work on tense, including embedded tense, or bound tense and tense in free indirect discourse and cross-linguistic typologies of tense. She has also contributed to the semantics of questions, and relative clauses the semantics of attitude verbs, negative polarity items, resumptive pronouns and superlatives.

Honors and distinctions 
She is an Associate Editor at the Journal of Semantics.

Selected publications

References 

Women linguists
University of California, Los Angeles faculty
Year of birth missing (living people)
Living people
Rutgers University alumni
Linguists from the United States